Nawaf Mohammad Al-Otaibi (born May 4, 1982) (Arabic: نواف محمد العتيبي) is a Kuwaiti footballer.

International goals
Scores and results list Kuwait's goal tally first.

References

External links

Living people
Kuwaiti footballers
1982 births
Place of birth missing (living people)
Association footballers not categorized by position
Kuwait international footballers
Al Salmiya SC players
Al-Fahaheel FC players
Al-Sahel SC (Kuwait) players
Al-Arabi SC (Kuwait) players
Kuwait Premier League players
Al-Sulaibikhat SC players